José Antonio Kast Rist (born 18 January 1966), also known by his initials JAK, is a Chilean lawyer and politician. Kast ran for president in 2021, winning the first round and losing in the second round run-off to Gabriel Boric.

Part of the Kast family, his grandfather was a lieutenant in the Nazi army and his father Miguel Kast worked as ministry of state and president of the Central Bank of Chile during the dictatorship of Augusto Pinochet. He served as a member of the Chamber of Deputies from 2002 to 2018, representing District 24 of Peñalolén and La Reina. Kast was a member of the Independent Democratic Union until 2016, becoming an independent politician until 2019 when he formed the conservative Chilean Republican Party and the think tank Republican Ideas. He previously ran for president as an independent candidate in the 2017 Chilean general election, and has been the leader of Republican Action since 2018.

Kast has been labelled as far-right, and supports law and order messaging and free market economic policies, while opposing abortion, same-sex marriage, and illegal immigration.

Early life
Kast's parents, Michael Kast Schindele and Olga Rist Hagspiel, were originally from Bavaria. His father had been a lieutenant in the German Army and a Nazi Party member, who fled to Chile in December 1950 during the denazification of Germany and settled in Buin, a commune within the Maipo Department in Santiago Province (current Santiago Metropolitan Region).

Kast's mother, along with two of his siblings, Michael (later Miguel) and Barbara, arrived in Chile  in 1951. The family founded Cecinas Bavaria, a sausage factory, in 1962, where the family made most of their fortune. In total, Kast's parents had 10 children, three of whom predeceased their parents. The Intercept noted that Michael Kast Schindele parented children "who shared his far-right politics". Kast's late brother Miguel was an economist and Chicago Boy who served under Augusto Pinochet as labor minister and president of the Central Bank of Chile, and Kast is also the uncle of Political Evolution senator Felipe Kast.

He was a candidate for the presidency of the university's student federation (FEUC). As a student, Kast appeared on the 1988 Chilean national plebiscite electoral space, supporting the option to extend Pinochet's rule for eight more years.

Kast founded a law firm in 1990. He was also the director of a real estate company owned by his family in the 1990s.

Political career
Between 1996 and 2000, Kast was a councilman in Buin. In 2001, he was elected as a member of the Chamber of Deputies for District 30 of San Bernardo. He was the Secretary General of the Independent Democratic Union, a party from which he resigned in order to run for president. While in the Chamber of Deputies, Kast gained the support of the Bishop of San Bernardo Juan Ignacio González Errázuriz, with the bishop writing a four-page document instructing his congregation to support those against emergency contraception and same-sex marriage. The support from the bishop was instrumental with Kast establishing his political career, with Kast's advocacy against contraception playing an important role in developing his support.

2017 presidential campaign

On 18 August 2017, Kast officially registered his independent candidacy with the Electoral Service, presenting 43,461 signatures. He was supported by right-wing, conservative, libertarian, nationalist and retired military groups, among others. Kast promoted a "less taxes, less government, pro-life" stance, as well as anti-illegal immigration government programs. His support of the former military government led to much controversy during his campaign, especially his proposal to forgive convicts over 80 years old who have age-related illnesses, including those who were convicted of human rights violations under Pinochet's government. He received 523,213 votes in the 2017 presidential election, representing 7.93% of the total votes and landing in the fourth place, although opinion polls only showed a 2% to 3% support for him. In the second round of the election, he supported Sebastián Piñera, who won the election. He remarked that "[In today's world,] Chileans need God", and said that the state should promote religion in schools by having available teachers for this subject when students choose to have them.

2018–2021

In terms of international relations, Kast proposed closing the border with Bolivia, arguing this measure would allow for a more effective fight against drug trafficking. In 2018, he called on the government to sever diplomatic relations with France in retaliation for the asylum granted to former guerrilla Ricardo Palma Salamanca.

In March 2018, during a tour of Chilean universities, Kast was scheduled to give a talk at the Arturo Prat University in Iquique, but was physically assaulted by protesters opposed to his political views. Kast also claimed censorship by the University of Concepción and the Austral University of Chile.

In the 2018 Brazilian general election, Kast supported Jair Bolsonaro. In April 2018, Kast launched the right-wing political movement called Republican Action.

In September 2019, Kast was accused of failing to declare money transferred to companies in Panama. Kast recognized the existence of these companies but denied that he owned them, saying they were owned by his brother, Christian Kast. He then defended the right of Chilean people to invest abroad.
In May 2019, he created the think tank Republican Ideas and in June 2019 he created the Chilean Republican Party. He opposed the demonstrations that took place during the 2019 Chilean protests, saying that they were not part of a social movement but were instead acts of violence organized by terrorists. As approval for the protests decreased, Kast was able to establish support of Chileans who opposed the violence observed during the protests. During the 2020 Chilean national plebiscite regarding changing the Constitution of Chile, he was one of the main supporters and campaigners for rejecting the option, which received 21.72% of the vote; the constitutional change was approved by 78.28% of the vote.

In the 2021 Chilean Constitutional Convention election, Kast made a political pact with the center-right coalition  to form a joint list of candidates for the election called . The list obtained 20.6% of the vote, representing less than one-third of the Constitutional Convention. Kast proposed one of the main candidates of the pact, Teresa Marinovic, whose political views aligned with Kast's but was not well received by parts of the center-right. However, Marinovic won with a high percentage of votes and, thanks to the D'Hondt method, many other candidates were able to enter the Constitutional Convention with her triumph.

2021 presidential campaign 

In 2018, Kast confirmed his intentions of running for president in the 2021 Chilean general election. In this election, he ran under his own Republican Party along with candidates for the Chamber of Deputies and Senate, unlike in his previous presidential candidacy in 2017, in which he ran as an independent. Kast formed the Christian Social Front, a political pact to present a list of candidates from the Republican Party and the Christian Conservative Party. Kast has held campaign proposals that have been controversial. He supports the pardoning of former Pinochet officials of "advanced age", which would generally include all officials imprisoned. He also proposed banning abortion, fusing the Ministry of Women and Gender Equality, remove Chile from the United Nations Human Rights Council and building more prisons.

During his campaigning, Kast used the slogan "make Chile a great country", which was compared to Donald Trump's Make America Great Again slogan, with some supporters wearing Make America Great Again apparel at his events. Kast did not participate in the  presidential primary, which was won by Sebastián Sichel. Sichel was considered as the main right-wing candidate in the polls at the beginning of the election. However, after the first debate on television, Kast started to surpass Sichel and became the top candidate on the right. He received the most votes in the first round of the election, nearly 28% of total votes cast, and he qualified for the run-off against Gabriel Boric.

Following his success in the first round, Kast garnered the support of most of Chile's right-wing groups, including President Sebastián Piñera. Internationally, Kast has found solidarity with other right-wing figures, signing the Madrid Charter – a document condemning left-wing groups in Ibero-America authored by the far-right Vox party of Spain – beside other international signatories; Rafael López Aliaga of Peru, Javier Milei of Argentina and Eduardo Bolsonaro of Brazil, the son of President Jair Bolsonaro. On 30 November 2021, Kast began to make international connections during his campaign, meeting in Washington, D.C. with Republican United States Senator Marco Rubio, the Chilean ambassador to the Organization of American States and at least twenty American business executives invested in Chile, including María Paulina Uribe of PepsiCo and Joel Velasco of UnitedHealth Group. On 19 December 2021, Kast conceded defeat after losing to Boric in the run-off and promised "constructive collaboration".

Political positions 
Kast has been described as a far-right, which he denies, and is a supporter of former dictator Augusto Pinochet. He has called for a "firm hand" to govern Chile. Kast is a conservative, and supports law and order and free-market economic policies, saying the 2021 election was a choice "between freedom and communism – between democracy and communism". Kast has expressed right-wing populist positions, and he opposes illegal immigration, abortion, and same-sex marriage in Chile, supporting social benefits only for women who are married. Concerning heritage and culture, Kast claims to "defend Chile's European heritage and national unity against the left's espousal of indigenous groups and multiculturalism." Kast rejects the overwhelming scientific consensus on climate change, downplaying its dangers and denying mankind's contribution to it. His public speaking mannerisms and conservatism have been compared to Brazilian president Jair Bolsonaro. Kast's support for a ditch along the Chile-Bolivia border to reduce illegal immigration has been compared to former U.S president Donald Trump's support for a wall along the Mexico–United States border.

Personal life
Kast is married to María Pía Adriasola; the couple has nine children. He is a practising Roman Catholic and a member of the Schoenstatt Apostolic Movement.

References

External links

Personal website (in Spanish)
Biography by CIDOB (in Spanish)

1966 births
20th-century Chilean lawyers
20th-century Roman Catholics
Candidates for President of Chile
Chilean anti-communists
Chilean anti-same-sex-marriage activists
Chilean city councillors
Chilean people of German descent
Chilean Roman Catholics
Conservatism in Chile
Far-right politics in Chile
Independent Democratic Union politicians
José Antonio
Living people
Members of Catholic organizations
Members of the Chamber of Deputies of Chile
Politicians from Santiago
Pontifical Catholic University of Chile alumni
Republican Party (Chile, 2019) politicians
Right-wing populism in South America
Signers of the Madrid Charter
Chilean anti-abortion activists